Hasi Chaolu is a Chinese-Mongolian film director.

Career
His 2006 film The Old Barber won Golden Peacock Award at IFFI (2006), and Best Film award at Pune International Film Festival (2007). His 2018 film Genghis Khan was premiered at 8th Beijing International Film Festival.

Selected filmography
 Genghis Khan (2018) 
 The Old Barber (2006)

References

Chinese film directors
Living people
Year of birth missing (living people)